London Labour and the London Poor is a work of Victorian journalism by Henry Mayhew.  In the 1840s, he observed, documented and described the state of working people in London for a series of articles in a newspaper, the Morning Chronicle, which were later compiled into book form.

Mayhew went into deep, almost pedantic detail concerning the trades, habits, religion and domestic arrangements of the thousands of people working the streets of the city. Much of the material comprises detailed interviews in which people candidly describe their lives and work. For instance, Jack Black talks about his job as "rat and mole destroyer to Her Majesty" and remains in good humour despite his experience of a succession of near-fatal infections from bites.

Beyond that anecdotal material, Mayhew's articles are particularly notable for attempting to justify numerical estimates with other information, such as census data and police statistics. Thus, if the assertion is made that 8,000 of a particular type of trader operate in the streets, Mayhew compares that to the total number of miles of street in the city, with an estimate of how many traders operate per mile.

The articles were collected and published in three volumes in 1851. A fourth "Extra Volume", published in 1861, was co-written with Bracebridge Hemyng, John Binny and Andrew Halliday and covered the lives of streetwalkers, thieves and beggars, but it departed from the interview format to take a more general and statistical approach to its subject.

Mayhew's London
London in the 1840s was more like a 21st-century Third World megalopolis than a typical 19th-century city. A significant portion of the population had no fixed place of work, and indeed, many had no fixed abode. In classic fashion, the city teemed with outsiders and migrants from other parts of Britain, and with the British Empire's continued growth, people from all over the world gradually began arriving in the city, as well, to seek their fortune.

Items of commerce, such as food, drink, textiles and household goods were distributed by an army of carts and wagons. While goods were sold from storefronts, also thousands upon thousands of street-traders were generally lumped together as costermongers. Alongside these relatively familiar forms of trade in consumer goods and services, Mayhew's work describes lesser-known trades driven by now-obsolete markets and by sheer poverty, such as gathering of snails for food, and the extreme forms of recycling practised by pure finders (who collected dog dung for tanneries), the mudlarks (who spent their days combing the shores of the Thames for valuables hidden in the sand and silt) and 'toshers' (who searched the sewers for scrap metal and other valuables).

Mayhew's perception as an observer is unsurpassed in early descriptions of London's street scenes. His richly detailed descriptions are able to give an impression of what the street markets of his day were like. Here is a typical description by Mayhew:

Composition
The articles comprising London Labour and the London Poor were initially collected into three volumes in 1851. The 1861 edition included a fourth volume, co-written with Bracebridge Hemyng, John Binny and Andrew Halliday, on the lives of prostitutes, thieves and beggars; this extra volume took a more general and statistical approach to its subject than the earlier works.

He wrote in volume one: 'I shall consider the whole of the metropolitan poor under three separate phases, according as they will work, they can't work, and they won't work'.

Mayhew interviewed everyone — beggars, street-entertainers (such as Punch and Judy men), market traders, prostitutes, labourers, sweatshop workers, even down to the "mudlarks" who searched the stinking mud on the banks of the River Thames for wood, metal, rope and coal from passing ships, and the "pure-finders" who gathered dog faeces to sell to tanners. He described their clothes, how and where they lived, their entertainments and customs, and made detailed estimates of the numbers and incomes of those practicing each trade. The book describes how marginal and precarious many people's lives were, in what was at that time perhaps the richest city in the world.

Use in culture
Poet Philip Larkin used an extract from London Labour and the London Poor as the epigraph for his poem "Deceptions". The extract details a rape: "Of course I was drugged, and so heavily I did not regain consciousness until the next morning.  I was horrified to discover that I had been ruined, and for some days I was inconsolable, and cried like a child to be killed or sent back to my aunt."

Writer Ben Gwalchmai was inspired to write his satirical novel Purefinder after reading about pure finders in the works of Dickens and Mayhew. London Labour and the London Poor was also a regular reference in the creation of the novel.

Terry Pratchett's novel Dodger draws heavily from Mayhew's work.

Michele Robert's novel The Walworth Beauty presents a fictional account of the composition of London Labour and the London Poor.

In the annotations to Alan Moore's graphic novel From Hell, Moore cites London Labour and the London Poor as a source for the book's depictions of working-class Victorian life.

The Big City or the New Mayhew
In the early 1950s, Punch published a series of articles based upon and to some extent parodying London Labour and the London Poor. Although these articles were humorous, their purpose was still to document and describe the lives of working people in London. In 1953, the articles, which were written by Alex Atkinson and illustrated by Ronald Searle, were published in a single volume under the title The Big City or the New Mayhew.

See also 

 Street Life in London, 1877 book

Notes

References
London Labour and the London Poor; selections made and introduced by Victor Neuburg, Penguin Classics 1985, 
London Labour and the London Poor: Volume I, Dover Publications (1968), Paperback 
London Labour and the London Poor: Volume II, Dover Publications (1968), Paperback 
London Labour and the London Poor: Volume III, Dover Publications (1968), Paperback 
London Labour and the London Poor: Volume IV, Dover Publications (1983), Paperback, 
The Unknown Mayhew, Selections from the "Morning Chronicle" 1849-50, E. P. Thompson, Eileen Yeo (editors), The Merlin Press, 1971. Repr.: Pelican Classics, 1973

External links

 Gutenberg free edition of the London Labour and the London Poor volumes
 

English non-fiction literature
19th century in London
1851 non-fiction books
1861 non-fiction books
Books about poverty
Poverty in England